James Lofthouse (24 March 1894 – 1954) was an English professional footballer who played as an outside left in the Football League for The Wednesday, Rotherham County, Bristol Rovers and Queens Park Rangers.

Personal life 
Lofthouse served as a sergeant in the Royal Berkshire Regiment and the Labour Corps during the First World War.

Career statistics

References

English footballers
St Helens Recreation F.C. players
Stalybridge Celtic F.C. players
Reading F.C. players
Sheffield Wednesday F.C. players
Rotherham County F.C. players
Bristol Rovers F.C. players
Queens Park Rangers F.C. players
Aldershot F.C. players
English Football League players
1894 births
Association football outside forwards
1954 deaths
British Army personnel of World War I
Royal Berkshire Regiment soldiers
Royal Pioneer Corps soldiers